Europium(III) iodide is an inorganic compound containing europium and iodine with the chemical formula .

Preparation
Europium metal reacts directly with iodine to form europium(III) iodide:

Hydrated europium(III) iodide can be prepared dissolving europium(III) oxide or europium(III) carbonate in hydroiodic acid:

Europium powder reacts with iodine in THF to form a THF adduct of europium(III) iodide:

Structure
Europium(III) iodide adopts the bismuth(III) iodide (BiI3) crystal structure type, with octahedral coordination of each Eu3+ ion by 6 iodide ions.

Reactivity
Europium(III) iodide is used as the starting material for two of the main ways of preparing europium(II) iodide:

Reduction with hydrogen gas at 350 °C:

Thermal decomposition at 200 °C, a disproportionation reaction:

Europium(III) iodide nonahydrate, EuI3·9H2O, thermally decomposes to europium(II) iodide dihydrate, EuI2·H2O.

References

Europium(III) compounds
Iodides
Lanthanide halides